The University Research Corridor (URC) is an alliance between Michigan State University, the University of Michigan, and Wayne State University to transform, strengthen, and diversify the state of Michigan's economy.  The three institutions of the URC together draw $1.878 billion in federal academic research dollars to Michigan, 94 percent of the total coming into the state.

Over the past five years, URC universities have announced an average of one new invention every day, and collectively these discoveries have led to more than 500 license agreements for new technologies and systems. Detroit News columnist Dan Howes once wrote that the three universities together offer “the closest thing Michigan has to Silicon Valley—an intellectual powerhouse.”

The URC had 137,583 students enrolled in the fall of 2010. The students at the URC universities are drawn from throughout Michigan and around the world. Students from the state of Michigan accounted for 75% of total enrollment in the fall of 2009, while 15% came from elsewhere in the U.S. and the remaining 10% came from other countries.

Location

The URC institutions are all based in the southeast/south-central area of the Michigan's lower peninsula.  Wayne State University is located in the heart of the state's largest city — Detroit — in the Midtown Cultural Center.  Michigan State University is located four miles east of the Michigan State Capitol, in East Lansing.  The third university in the URC — the University of Michigan — is located 40 miles west of Detroit in Ann Arbor.

Transportation

The corridor is served by the three major Interstate Highways in Southeastern Michigan—I-75, I-94, and I-96. Further enabling the close collaboration between these institutions, each school is under a two-hour drive of its URC peers.

The main airport of the region—among the top 20 largest airports in the world—is the Detroit Metropolitan Wayne County Airport (DTW).  Both Wayne State University and The University of Michigan are roughly a half-hour drive from the Romulus-based airport.  However, when traveling to East Lansing, the Capital Region International Airport is the most convenient—just a 20-minute commute to the MSU campus.

Peer comparison

A 2014 Economic Impact Report by Anderson Economic Group ranked the URC second in the Innovation Power Ranking when compared to seven other major university research clusters in six states, including well-known hubs such as North Carolina’s Research Triangle Park, California’s Innovation Hubs and Massachusetts’ Route 128 Corridor. The report also found that URC universities conferred 32,483 graduate and undergraduate degrees in 2012, more than any of the university innovation clusters the URC has benchmarked itself against since 2007. The URC also granted the highest number of medical degrees and second-highest number of high-demand degrees overall, saw its research and development spending rise to nearly $2.1 billion and continued to commercialize its research through patents and start-up companies.

Ongoing emphasis

Economic Stimulus
 An economic report detailing the collective successes of the URC universities as well as a metric comparison to their peer clusters is released annually each winter.

Notes

External links
 URC
 Michigan State University
 Wayne State University
 University of Michigan

High-technology business districts in the United States
Economy of Michigan
Michigan State University
University of Michigan
Wayne State University
2006 establishments in Michigan